is a Japanese actress and voice actress from Nagasaki Prefecture, Japan affiliated with Ken Production.

Voice roles

Anime

2002 

 The Twelve Kingdoms (Takki)
 Pokémon Advance (Izumi)

2003 

 Astro Boy (Chris)
 Gad Guard (Sanada Kyouko)
 Shadow Star Narutaru (President)
 Fullmetal Alchemist (Izumi Curtis)

2004 

 Kaiketsu Zorori (Kabankaba, Luca)
 Samurai Champloo (Mother)
 Fafner (Ryouko Kasugai)
 BECK: Mongolian Chop Squad (Koyuki's Mom)

2005 

 Kaiketsu Zorori: The Movie
 Ichigo 100% (Manaka's mother)
 Black Cat (Annette Pias)
 Kotenkotenko (God of Lake)
 Paradise Kiss (Yasuko Hayasaka)

2006 

 Yomigaeru Sora -RESCUE WINGS- (Yukie Hasegawa)
 Renkin 3-kyuu Magical? Pokahn (Dr. K-Ko)
 Kemonozume (Imekura Girl, Old Granny)
 Silk Road Kids (Barbara)
 Ghost Slayers Ayashi (Sote Matsue)

2007 

 Deltora Quest (Zara)
 Nodame Cantabile (Nina Lutz)
 Emma: A Victorian Romance Second Act (Johanna)
 Mokke (Hiyoshi grandmother)
 Pururun! Shizuku-chan Aha (???)

2008 

 Shigofumi - Letters from the Departed (Risarra)
 Allison & Lillia (Radia)
 To Love-Ru (Amazon Queen)
 Nabari no Ou (Kourin Shimizu)
 Golgo 13 (Riz)
 Inazuma Eleven (Mother)
 Mōryō no Hako (Kimie Kusumoto)

2009 

 Hajime no Ippo: New Challenger (Tomiko)
 Fullmetal Alchemist: Brotherhood (Izumi Curtis)
 Sweet Blue Flowers (Chie Sugimoto)
 Kobato. (Farm Lady)
 Aoi Bungaku Series (Widow)
 Tamagotchi! (???)
 Fairy Tail (Grandine, Porlyusica)

2010 

 Nodame Cantabile: Finale (Nina Lutz)
 Black Butler II (Marguerite Turner)

2012 

 Kids on the Slope (???)
 Aikatsu! (Miwa Asakura)

2022 

 Ganbare! Lulu Lolo - Tiny Twin Bears

Movies 
 A Tree of Palme (2002) (???)
 Millennium Actress (2002) (Eiko)
 Fullmetal Alchemist: The Movie - Conqueror of Shamballa (2005) (Izumi Curtis)
 Mobile Suit Zeta Gundam: A New Translation (2005) (Namikar Cornell)
 Hal (2013) (Mami)

Video Games

2005 

 Fullmetal Alchemist: Dream Carnival (Izumi Curtis)
 Romancing SaGa (Eule, Adyllis)

2009 

 Kazeiro Surf (Ruidina Ritovaku)
 Fullmetal Alchemist: Daughter of the Dusk (Izumi Curtis)

2010 

 Hagane no Renkinjutsushi: Fullmetal Alchemist - Yakusoku no Hi e (Izumi Curtis)

2017 

The Legend of Zelda: Breath of the Wild (Impa)

Dubbing 
Charmed, The Seer (Debbi Morgan)

External links

Japanese voice actresses
Voice actresses from Nagasaki Prefecture
1963 births
Living people
20th-century Japanese actresses
21st-century Japanese actresses
Ken Production voice actors